Feminist is an adventure story arc of the Philippine comic strip series Pugad Baboy, created by Pol Medina Jr. and originally published in the Philippine Daily Inquirer. This particular story arc lasts 34 strips long. In 1994, the story arc was reprinted in PB5, the fifth book compilation of the comic strip series.

Synopsis
The Pugad Baboy ladies and gentlemen engage in a battle of the sexes precipitated by conversations Debbie has with Tomas' ultra-feminist wife, Barbie. The argument centers on the question of which is the weaker sex and on Filipino sexual stereotypes and gender roles. Things come to a head when Dagul and Tomas notice that their wives had been absent from home every night. They track the two women to a Muay Thai dojo, much to their surprise and dismay. The women also receive instruction on Tae Kwon Dog (a play on Tae Kwon Do) from Shin Dong Pol. In retaliation, the men quit their jobs and devote their time to Pao's beauty parlor and playing Mahjong.

Dagul soon hits a winning streak in the game. He was on his way home one night, accompanied by Debbie, when the pair were mugged by two goons intent upon divesting the mahjongero of his winnings. Dagul eggs his wife on, telling her to show the bad guys what she had learned in the martial arts. Debbie, however, reverts to the typical female fighting stereotype of hair-pulling. Dagul has no choice but to hand over his winnings to the goons, in keeping with his now-demure gender role. He blows up, however, when one of the muggers slaps Debbie. He beats up both bad guys and ended up with a serious stab wound to the abdomen. All three were rushed to the hospital where Dagul underwent surgery. Policemen placed the goons under arrest.

Upon his release from the hospital, Dagul begins to notice that Debbie had reverted to her former sweet, loving self - intent upon serving her recuperating husband.

In other media
Elements of the story arc were adapted for an episode of Rated PB (Pang-Bayan) - Pugad Baboy sa TV, a live action series based on the strip.

Pugad Baboy